The Licked Hand, known sometimes as The Doggy Lick or Humans Can Lick Too, is an urban legend.  It has several versions, and has been found in print as early as February 1982.

Plot
A very young girl is home alone for the first time with only her dog for company. Listening to the news, she hears of a killer on the loose in her neighborhood. Terrified, she locks all the doors and windows, but she forgets about the basement window and it is left unlocked. She goes to bed, taking her dog to her room with her and letting it sleep under her bed. She wakes in the night to hear a dripping sound coming from the bathroom. The dripping noise frightens her, but she is too scared to get out of bed and find out what it is. To reassure herself, she reaches a hand toward the floor for the dog and is rewarded by a reassuring lick on her hand. The next morning when she wakes, she goes to the bathroom for a drink of water only to find her dead, mutilated dog hanging in the shower with his blood slowly dripping onto the tiles. On the shower wall, written in the dog's blood, are the words "HUMANS CAN LICK TOO."

Other story variations feature a nearsighted old woman rather than a young girl. The fate of the dog also varies, from the dog simply being hanged to it being skinned, disemboweled, or otherwise mutilated. The message is sometimes written on the floor or on the bathroom mirror rather than on the wall. Some versions include the parents' return and their discovery of the killer hiding elsewhere in the house, frequently in the basement, the girl's bedroom closet, or under her bed. In other versions, the girl's parents arrive back in the morning and ask if their daughter had a good night. When she tells them that her dog had kept her calm by licking her hand, she is told that the dog in question had been locked either in the basement or outside. The story usually either ends with the killer never being found and/or the girl dying.

Appearances in media

There is a forerunner in the 1919 story "The Diary of Mr. Poynter" by M. R. James, where a young man absently strokes his dog (as he thinks) while reading an old manuscript account of the sinister death of a young student obsessed with his own hair. Of course, the creature crouching at his side is not the dog.
This legend was told around a fire in the movie Death Screams 1982.
This legend was featured in the film Campfire Tales (1997), story credited to DB Martin.
A variation of the story is featured in the film Urban Legends: Final Cut.
The episode "Family Remains" of Supernatural features an alteration in which a feral child licks the hand of a teenage girl who panics when she realizes that her dog is in the hallway. In this version she sees the dog alive and realizes it's not the pet licking her, although the dog is mutilated when the show's heroes attempt to help the family escape.
It is also used by Bloody Mary in the follow-up to Urban Legends Final Cut, entitled Urban Legends: Bloody Mary, as a way to murder one of the high school boys that she sees as guilty for her death.
It is referenced in John Dies at the End, where the main character goes to bed (intending to lure out a ghost) and wakes up to find his dog still licking his hand, until he realizes he can hear his dog lapping water from the toilet next door.
A variation is told by one of the main characters in the premiere episode of The Enfield Haunting.
A variation is written as the backstory for the character Reimi Sugimoto from Jump manga JoJo's Bizarre Adventure: Part 4, Diamond Is Unbreakable by Hirohiko Araki.

References

Notes

Sources
David Martin Brown/DB Martin. "Bedtime for Sam". Calhoun, EBDB Books, Feb 1982 and is credited in two films for the origin of the legend.
Baker, Ronald L. Hoosier Folk Legends. Bloomington, Indiana University Press, 1982.
Brunvand, Jan Harold. The Choking Doberman. New York: W. W. Norton & Company, 1984.

Urban legends
Fiction about animal cruelty